Indian folk music is diverse because of India's enormous cultural diversity. It is sung in various languages and dialects throughout the length and breadth of this vast nation and exported to different parts of the world owing to migration.

Tamang Selo
Tamang Selo is a musical genre of the Tamang people and widely popular amongst the Nepali speaking community in India and around the world. It is usually accompanied by Tamang instruments, the Damphu, Madal and Tungna. although modern instruments have found their way into the compositions these days A Selo could be very catchy, attractive and lively or slow and melodious and is usually sung to express love, sorrow and stories of day-to-day life.
Hira Devi Waiba is hailed as the pioneer of Nepali Folk songs and Tamang Selo. Her song 'Chura ta Hoina Astura' (चुरा त होइन अस्तुरा) is said to be the first Tamang Selo ever recorded. Waiba has sung nearly 300 songs in a career spanning 40 years. After Waiba's death in 2011, her son Satya Aditya Waiba (producer) and Navneet Aditya Waiba (singer) collaborated and re-recorded her most iconic songs and released an album titled Ama Lai Shraddhanjali (आमालाई श्रद्धाञ्जली-Tribute to Mother).

Bhavageethe

Bhavageethe (literally 'emotion poetry') is a form of expressionist poetry and light music. When an emotional poem having excellent poetic components becomes a song, it is known as a "Bhaavageeth". Most of the poetry sung in this genre pertain to subjects like love, nature, and philosophy, and the genre itself is not much different from Ghazals, though Ghazals are bound to a peculiar metre. This genre is quite popular in many parts of India, notably in Karnataka and Maharashtra. Bhavageethe may be called by different names in other languages.

Kannada Bhavageethe draws from the poetry of modern, including Kuvempu, D.R. Bendre, Gopalakrishna Adiga, K.S. Narasimhaswamy, G.S. Shivarudrappa, K. S. Nissar Ahmed, and N S Lakshminarayana Bhatta. Notable Bhavageethe performers include P. Kalinga Rao, Mysore Ananthaswamy, C. Aswath, Shimoga Subbanna, Archana Udupa, and Raju Ananthaswamy.

C. N. Joshi is one of the foremost Bhaavageet singers in Marathi. Gajanan Watave  is known for making the Bhaavageet tradition flourish in homes of Maharashtra.

Bhaavageete in Marathi draws from the works of Shanta Shelke, Vinda Karandikar, Jagdish Khebudkar, Ga Di Madgulkar, Raja Badhe and Mangesh Padgaonkar. Bhaavgeete composers include Sudhir Phadke, Shrinivas Khale and Yashwant Deo. Singers include Suresh Wadkar, Arun Date, Suman Kalyanpur, Lata Mangeshkar, Asha Bhosle and Bhimsen Joshi. Many books containing compilations of Bhaavageete in Marathi are available.

Bhangra and Giddha

Bhangra (Punjabi: ਭੰਗੜਾ) is a form of dance-oriented folk music of Punjab. The present musical style is derived from non traditional musical accompaniment to the riffs of Punjab called by the same name. The female dance of Punjab region is known as Giddha (Punjabi: ਗਿੱਧਾ).

Lavani

Lavani is a popular folk form of Maharashtra. Traditionally, the songs are sung by female artists, but male artists may occasionally sing Lavanis. The dance format associated with Lavani is known as Tamasha.This dance format contains the dancer (Tamasha Bai), the helping dancer - Maavshi, The Drummer - Dholki vaala & The Flute Boy - Baasuri Vaala.

Sufi folk rock
Sufi folk rock contains elements of modern hard rock and traditional folk music with Sufi poetry. While it was pioneered by bands like Junoon in Pakistan, it became very popular especially in north India. In 2005, Rabbi Shergill released a Sufi rock song called "Bulla Ki Jaana", which became a chart-topper in India and Pakistan. More recently, the Sufi folk rock song "Bulleya" from the 2016 film Ae Dil Hai Mushkil became a mammoth hit.

Dandiya

Dandiya is a dance-oriented folk music that has also been adapted for pop music worldwide, popular in Western India, especially during Navaratri. The present musical style is derived from the traditional musical accompaniment to the folk dance of Dandiya called by the same name.

Jhumair and Domkach
Jhumair and Domkach are Nagpuri folk music.  The musical instruments used in folk music and dance are Dhol, Mandar, Bansi, Nagara, Dhak, Shehnai, Khartal, Narsinga etc.

Pandavani

Pandavani is a folk singing style of musical narration of tales from ancient epic Mahabharata with 
musical accompaniment and Bhima as hero. This form of folk theatre is popular in the state of Chhattisgarh and in the neighbouring tribal areas of Orissa and Andhra Pradesh.

Rajasthani music has a diverse collection of musician castes, including langas, sapera, bhopa, jogi and Manganiar.

Bauls

The Bauls of Bengal were an order of musicians in 18th, 19th and early 20th century India who played a form of music using a khamak, ektara and dotara. The word Baul comes from Sanskrit batul meaning divinely inspired insanity. They are a group of Hindu mystic minstrels. They are thought to have been influenced greatly by the Hindu tantric sect of the Kartabhajas as well as by Sufi sects.  Bauls travel in search of the internal ideal, Maner Manush (Man of the Heart).

Bhatiali 
This type of music was cultured mainly by the oarsmen and fishermen of erstwhile Bengal. There are many opinions regarding the origin of the term "Bhatiali". Most popular of them are: 
 They use to sing it in the Ebb (Bhata) as in this phase it does not need much effort for rowing.
 It originated from the Bhati area (now in Bangladesh).
One of the most eminent singers is Nirmalendu Chowdhury.

Bihu

Bihu songs are the most famous among music lovers in Assam and are based on themes like Assamese new year, farmers' daily life, love and more. Bihu music is played with instruments like  dhol, mohor singor pepa, cymbal, a bamboo instrument called gogona and a clapper made from bamboo known as toka. Bihu music is reflective of the Oriental influence on Assam's folk music. It is an absolute delight to sit and listen to heart-touching Bihu songs during the Bihu festival when the entire state is in a celebratory mood. The talented musicians of the state have been following this traditional form of music since generations and listening to them sing in joy is an unmatched experience for every tourist.

Garba
Garba ("song") is sung in honor of Hindu goddesses and gods during Navratri. They are sung in the honor of god Krishna, Hanuman, Ram, etc.

Dollu Kunita
This is a group dance that is named after the Dollu — the percussion instrument used in the dance. It is performed by the menfolk of the Kuruba community of the North Karnataka area. The group consists of 16 dancers who wear the drum and beat it to rhythms while dancing. The beat is controlled and directed by a leader with cymbals who is positioned in the center. Slow and fast rhythms alternate and group weaves varied patterns.

Kolata/Kolattam
Kolata/Kolattam is a traditional folk dance of the states of Andhra Pradesh, Karnataka and Tamil Nadu. Similar to its North Indian counterpart Dandiya Ras, it is performed with coloured sticks and usually involves both men and women dancing together.

Uttarakhandi music 
Uttarakhandi folk music had its roots in the lap of nature. The pure and blessed music have the feel and the touch of nature and subjects related to nature. The folk music primarily is related to the festivals, religious traditions, folk stories and simple life of the people of Uttarakhand. Thus the songs of Uttarakhand are a true reflection of the cultural heritage and the way people live their lives in the Himalayas. Tabla and harmonium are also used but to a lesser extent. The main languages are Kumaoni and Garhwali.

Veeragase
Veeragase is a dance folk form prevalent in the state of Karnataka. It is a vigorous dance based on Hindu mythology and involves very intense energy-sapping dance movements. Veeragase is one of the dances demonstrated in the Dasara procession held in Mysore.

Naatupura Paatu
Naatupura Paatu is Tamil folk music. It consists of Gramathisai (village folk music) and Gana (city folk music). It is also sung in Rajasthan. It is the oldest folk song in India.

Distribution 
Andhra Pradesh: Madiga Dappu, Mala Jamidika
Assam: Bihu Geet, Tokari geet, Kamrupi Lokgeet, Goalparia Lokogeet, Borgeet
Chhattisgarh: Pandavani
Gujarat: Garba, Doha
Jharkhand: Jhumair, Domkach
Karnataka: Bhavageete
Maharashtra: Bhavageete, Lavani, Powada, Bhajan, Pravachan, Bhakteegeete, Natya Sangeet, Bharud, Gondhal, Lalita, Abhang and Tumbadi
Odisha: Sambalpuri and Lalita
Punjab: Mahiyan
North West India: Sufi Folk Rock
North India: Biraha
Tamil Nadu: Naattupura Padalgal
Telangana: Janapadha Geyalu
West Bengal: Tamang Selo, Bahula, bhatiyali, Kirtan

References

External links
 Chhattisgarhi Folk Song & Ballad

 
Indian styles of music
Folk music by country